Beecher is a surname. Notable people with the surname include:

Beecher family, a prominent New England family, consisting of:
Lyman Beecher, American clergyman, father of:
Catharine Beecher, educator
Charles Beecher, minister
Edward Beecher, theologian
Harriet Beecher Stowe, abolitionist and novelist
Henry Ward Beecher, clergyman
Isabella Beecher Hooker, leader in the women's suffrage movement
Charles Emerson Beecher (1856–1904), American paleontologist
Franny Beecher (1921–2014), guitarist for Bill Haley and His Comets
Gordon Beecher, American composer
Henry K. Beecher, physician
John Beecher (disambiguation)
Philemon Beecher, U.S. congressman from Ohio

Other uses 
"BEECHER", a hymn tune by John Zundel named for Henry Ward Beecher

Tobias Beecher, fictional character of the TV show Oz
Giles Beecher Jackson (1853–1924), African-American lawyer, newspaper publisher, entrepreneur, and civil rights activist

See also 
 Beacher, surname
 Beecher's (disambiguation)